An election for President of Israel was held in the Knesset on 22 March 1983.

History
Yitzhak Navon, elected in 1978, turned down the opportunity to run for a second term of office.
Chaim Herzog was elected by the Knesset to serve as the sixth President of Israel, by a vote of 61 to 57. He was opposed by Menachem Elon, the candidate of the right and the government coalition. Herzog's term began on 5 May. He held office until 1993, when Ezer Weizman was elected president.

Results

References

President
Presidential elections in Israel
Israel